El Gran Show ("The Amazing Show") was a dance reality show airing since 2010 on América Televisión in Perú. The show is the Peruvian version of the Mexican television series Bailando por un sueño. The show is hosted by Gisela Valcárcel, alongside Miguel Arce, who became co-host in season sixteen. Cristian Rivero was co-host in seasons one through five, Óscar López Arias co-hosted seasons seven through eight, Paco Bazán in seasons nine through fourteen and Jaime "Choca" Mandros in seasons fifteen, and Miguel Arce beginning with the sixteen season.

Every season, celebrities and amateur dancers (Dreamers) are paired up. Celebrities have included actors, models, singers, athletes, television hosts, and comedians. The format is similar to Bailando por un sueño and El Show De Los Sueños: 11 participants called "Dreamers" star in a dance competition in which the winner will realize a dream that becomes public knowledge, either to resolve a personal problem or to help someone else. The program focuses on social assistance that can be provided to talented people who have no economic means to achieve certain goals.  The tool that these dreamers have to overcome adversity is their talent for dancing.  Eleven couples (dreamer and hero) compete over 10 weekly galas, in which the couple who received the fewest telephone votes from viewers is eliminated.  At the final gala, two couples compete to determine who will win the long-awaited fulfilment of their dream.

Cast

Hosts
Gisela Valcárcel has been the host since the program's premiere in 2010. In season one through five, her co-host was Cristian Rivero. The season six, no did have co-host. Óscar López Arias was co-host for seasons seven through eight (2012), who was then replaced by Paco Bazán from seasons nine through fourteen (2013–15). In the 2016' season, Jaime "Choca" Mandros (who had participated in the season nine) was co-host in season fifteen and Miguel Arce in season sixteen.

Color key:

Judging panel
The regular judges are Morella Petrozzi and Pachi Valle Riestra, both are judges in all seasons, and Carlos Cacho who entered the eight season to present. They were also members of the judging panel, but shorter periods: Carlos Alcántara (winner of the first season of Bailando por un Sueño), Stuart Bishop, Alexis Grullón (who later would participate in the show), Rosanna Lignarolo, Phillip Butters, Max Suffrau, Alfredo Di Natale and Michelle Alexander. Other celebrities, most often those who are associated with the world of dancing, music, acting or TV, and past contestants have appeared as a judge or in absence of one of the main judges, including Marco Zunino, Vania Masías, Johanna San Miguel, Abel Talamantez, Federico Salazar, Fiorella Rodríguez and Bettina Oneto. In the 2016 the format change, each week was a guest judge, who give couples 1 or 2 points more, even they could refuse to just granting it.

Color key:

Series overview

Scoring and voting procedure
The first season of the Peruvian reality show “El Gran Show” was dedicated only to dance. Eleven couples, consisting of a celebrity (called a "hero") and an amateur dancer (called a "dreamer")  would dance each week, and all couples would dance the same style of dance.  At the end of the show, Gisela revealed who was the winning couple of the week and the bottom two couples with the lowest scores who would go into judgment.

Scoring and the secret score: Each judge gives a 1 to 10 score, for a total score of 4 to 40. One of the scores are not shown in the same airing, it will be revealed in the end of the show with intent that couples can not add or predict final scores and keep tensions and expectations until the time of "The Case"
The Case: The bottom two couples are automatically in risk of being eliminated. The audience members have the entire week (Saturday to Saturday) to vote for their favorite couple.  The sentenced couples must induce people to vote for them. On Saturday the bottom two couples are sent to duel.
The Duel: The bottom two couples must dance a different dance style than all the non-sentenced couples with professional dancers. While the show is airing, the represented cities of the couples are connected live to the show, to illustrate the support of the family and sometimes of the mayor.  At the end of the show, before the Judgment, Gisela reveals the percentages of the two couples.  The couple with lowest percentage is eliminated and their score is void.
Faith Balls: The use of "Faith Balls" was introduced in the sixth gala of the first season, but was also used in the second season of "El Show de Los Sueños". Before Gisela revealed the percentages of the bottom two couples, a big glass cup with eight secret balls inside was brought onstage. Six balls have the El Gran Show's logo and two have an "X". Both couples choose one ball. If the chosen ball has the El Gran Show's logo, Gisela cancels the percentage and the two couples are automatically safe. But if they choose the "X", Gisela must read the results and one couple is eliminated.

See also 
 Bailando por un Sueño, which contains a full list of international versions.
 Strictly Come Dancing, the original British version of the program.
 Dancing with the Stars, which contains a full list of international versions.

References

 
2010 Peruvian television series debuts
2017 Peruvian television series endings
2010s Peruvian television series
América Televisión original programming